Dielis dorsata, the Caribbean scoliid wasp, is a species of scoliid wasp in the family Scoliidae.

References

External links

 

Scoliidae